Raise Vibration is the eleventh studio album by American rock musician Lenny Kravitz. It was released on Roxie Records via BMG Rights Management on September 7, 2018  and produced seven singles.

Background
Kravitz explained that he struggled with serious writer’s block while trying to focus on this album. Raise Vibration is a socially-conscious album, containing twelve compositions that address multiple issues plaguing the world. As on most of his other studio recordings, Kravitz plays most of the instruments himself, with longtime guitarist Craig Ross and keyboardist/orchestrator David Baron being the only collaborators (other than string and horn players). The album has produced four singles. "It's Enough!" is a song against corporate greed, political corruption, and racism. The follow-up single "Low" explores the perils of his near-mythical sensuality with intonations alluding to his past intimate relationships. The song "Low" was released as a single and a video approximately six weeks before the album. It contains vocal extracts from Michael Jackson.

Song "5 More Days 'Til Summer" was released as the third single and is much more upbeat than "Low" and "It’s Enough!". The song "Johnny Cash", a mix of psychedelic country and western, was released as the fourth single to be a tribute to American legendary country singer Johnny Cash, who died on September 12, 2003. Kravitz claims to have met Cash and his wife June Carter in 1995 when he was flatmates with Rick Rubin in Los Angeles, when he encountered Cash and his wife after being called that his mother had died. He recalls the memory in the song, and pays respect to the legend.

The album was recorded in Eleuthera island, Bahamas, of which Kravitz is a long time resident—he has previously stated that many of his songs were written while staying there.

Reception
At Metacritic, which assigns a weighted mean rating out of 100 to reviews from mainstream critics, the album received an average score of 62, based on six reviews, which indicates "generally favorable reviews".

Madison Desler of Paste Magazine commented "So here we are at the end of this album, left with the question, after 30 years, where does he stand? Is Lenny Kravitz a low-key legend? Let’s say yes—French people love him, he’s been praised and pilloried in equal measure and he has some tried-and-true bangers. Is Lenny Kravitz still cool? Not sure. This album is sending mixed messages. Will the giant scarf always be a thing? Most definitely". Darryl G. Wright of Spectrum Culture added "It’s easy to develop a romantic mental picture of the aging rock star, but the reality of Kravitz’s latest work is far less appealing ... the album as a whole, fails to offer anything new or fresh. If you’re looking for positivity in 2018, you’re also probably looking for truth. That’s in short supply here".

Kory Grow of Rolling Stone stated "Lenny Kravitz gets angry in only the most Lenny Kravitz way possible: with a high-pitched “hoooo,” some funky bass and his typically über-passionate vocal delivery. Nearly every track on his 11th album, Raise Vibration – at least those that aren’t his signature love songs – seems like he intended it to be an anthem for resistance in the Trump era... Mostly, it’s Kravitz’s signature blend of rock and soul, love and social outrage, only this time with a little more bite". Zachary Hoskins of Slant Magazine wrote "Raise Vibration'''s more serious shortcoming is its lyrics, which stumble whenever they reach for grand proclamations on the state of the world". Mark Kennedy of Chicago Sun-Times wrote "Still, Kravitz has given us enough meaty tunes to last us until he’s ready again to come ride to our rescue".

Track listing

Personnel
Credits for Raise Vibration'' adapted from Tidal.

Musicians
 Lenny Kravitz - vocals, composition, writing, arrangement
 Craig Ross - electric guitar, acoustic guitar, hand claps, moog
 Michael Jackson - posthumous vocals on "Low"
 Michael Andrews - additional vocals on "Raise Vibration"
 Michael Bellanger - additional vocals on "Raise Vibration"
 Sam Lopez - additional vocals on "Raise Vibration"
 Carmer Carter, Fred White, Jason Morales, John Fluker, Kennya Ramsey, Makeda Francisco, Nikko Lowe, Nikisha Grier-Daniel, Tiffany Smith, Tim Kepler, Valerie Pinkston, Will Wheaton - background vocals on "Here to Love"
 Alix Jones Bragg, Deanna Levitt, Ella Davis Bragg, Katelyn Cambridge, Kyra Courtemanche, Nicole Gamma, Petagay Hollinsed-Hartman - chorus vocals on "5 More Days 'Til Summer"
 Lenny Castro - cuica, congas
 Lisa Wong - looping
 Harold Todd - saxophone
 Michael Sherman - saxophone
 Ludovic Louis - trumpet
 David Baron - mellotoron, moog, piano, strings, synthesizer
 George Laks - keyboards
 Miguel - hand claps on "Gold Dust"

Technical
 Lenny Kravitz - production, arrangement, mixing
 Craig Ross - mixing engineering, recording engineering, drum programming
 David Baron - orchestration arrangement
 Bernie Grundman - mastering engineering
 Gavin Paddock - assistant engineering
 Jennifer Gros - assistant engineering
 Jeremy Nichols - assistant engineering
 Matthieu Lefevre - assistant engineering

Artwork
 Mathieu Bitton - art direction, design, photography

Charts

Weekly charts

Year-end charts

Certifications

References

External links

2018 albums
Lenny Kravitz albums
Albums produced by Lenny Kravitz
BMG Rights Management albums